Hou Hanru (born 1963 in Guangzhou, China) is an international art curator and critic based in San Francisco, Paris and Rome. He is Artistic Director of the MAXXI in Rome, Italy.

Biography
Hou graduated from the Central Academy of Fine Arts in Beijing and moved to Paris in 1990. He lived 16 years in France before moving to the United States in 2006. He worked at San Francisco Art Institute as Director of Exhibitions and Public Program and Chair of Exhibition and Museum Studies from 2006 to 2012. He is Artistic Director of MAXXI, National Museum of 21st Century Arts, Rome since 2013.

He has curated numerous exhibitions including "Cities on the Move" (1997–1999), Shanghai Biennale (2000), Gwangju Biennale (2002), Venice Biennale (French Pavilion, 1999, Z.O.U. -- Zone Of Urgency, 2003, Chinese Pavilion, 2007), Canton Express (2003, Venice), Nuit Blanche (2004, Paris), the 2nd Guangzhou Triennial (2005), the 2nd Tirana Biennial (2005), the 10th Istanbul Biennial (2007), "Global Multitude" (Luxembourg 2007), "Trans(cient)City" (Luxembourg 2007), EV+A 2008 (Limerick), "The Spectacle of the Everyday, The 10th Lyon Biennale" (Lyon, 2009), the 5th Auckland Triennial (Auckland, New Zealand, May - August 2013), etc.

He has been consultant and advisor in many international institutions including Walker Art Center (Minneapolis), Solomon R. Guggenheim Museum (New York), Kumamoto Museum of Contemporary Art (Kumamoto, Japan), De Appel Foundation (Amsterdam), Rockbund Art Museum (Shanghai), Times Museum (Guangzhou), Today Art Museum (Beijing), Power Station of Art (Shanghai), Deutsche Bank Collection (Frankfurt), Kadist Art Foundation (San Francisco/Paris), Asia Art Archive (Hong Kong), etc. and served in juries of many international awards including the Hugo Boss Prize (Guggenheim Museum), Chinese Contemporary Art Award (Beijing), Ars Fennica (Helsinki), Credit Suisse/Today Art Award (Today Art Museum, Beijing) and Hugo Boss Prize China (Rockbund Art Museum, Shanghai).

He has also taught and lectured in various artistic and educational institutions including Rijksakademie van Beeldende Kunsten (Amsterdam), HISk (Antwerp /Ghent), Forecast (Berlin), as well as numerous universities and museums across the world.

A selection of his writings was published as "On The Mid-Ground" by Timezone 8, 2002. His recent books include "Paradigm Shifts, Walter & McBean Galleries exhibitions and public programs, San Francisco Art Institute, 2006-2011", San Francisco Art Institute, 2011 (with Mary Ellyn Johnson). A frequent contributor to conferences, catalogues, magazines and books of contemporary art, he is also a guest editor for international art journals including Flash Art, YIshu, Art Asia Pacific and LEAP.

References

External links
Archive of writing on Art Practical
Artpractical.com
Curator's Portrait by University of Melbourne 
Essay on Curatorial Practice: Initiatives, Alternatives

Chinese art curators
1963 births
Artists from Guangzhou
Living people
San Francisco Art Institute faculty
Chinese expatriates in the United States
Central Academy of Fine Arts alumni
Chinese art critics
Chinese expatriates in France
Chinese expatriates in Italy
Directors of museums in Italy